Saps at Sea is a 1940 American comedy film directed by Gordon Douglas, distributed by United Artists. It was Laurel and Hardy's last film produced by the Hal Roach Studios, as well as the last film to feature Ben Turpin and Harry Bernard.

Plot 

Stan and Ollie work in a horn factory, where Hardy is already under stress from all the incessant noise. The episode begins with a worker getting carted out (Eddie Borden) after having gone insane and is the latest casualty of the work environment, the "fourth one this week" according to a watching police officer. Ollie is sent home after developing "hornophobia", which results in his going crazy each time he hears horns or horn-based musical instruments. A physician (Jimmy Finlayson) is called to treat Ollie and, warning Ollie that he could develop a more serious condition, "hornomania," prescribes a relaxing boat trip and goat's milk. Ollie dismisses the idea because he is afraid to sail on the ocean, but Stan offers an alternative: they will simply rent a boat and keep it attached to the dock, getting all the sea air they can while never actually going out to sea. A running gag in the episode is when one of the boys tries to turn on the taps and gas hobs, only for the one opposite to go on instead due to the janitor being cross-eyed, which results in Stan destroying half the kitchen area with a gas explosion and Ollie vowing to find the janitor and give him a very large piece of his mind. On the way down, Ollie is accosted by his Scottish neighbor who inquires as to whether he is having trouble with his apartment, then drags him into hers when he confirms it to be all "topsy-turvy". She shows him what happened when she turned on her radio that morning (causing her fridge to loudly blare music when opened, while the radio itself is covered in an indiscernible white substance), causing Ollie to give the janitor a piece of her mind as well. When Stan's trombone teacher (Eddie Conrad) arrives and Ollie, returning from a fight with the janitor (Ben Turpin), hears the music, goes berserk and throws the teacher out, he knows he should take that advice. Phoning the hotel manager to complain why that teacher was allowed in, Hardy is accidentally knocked out the window and into the street.

Stan and Ollie rent an unseaworthy boat called Prickly Heat that is supposed to stay moored to the dock. Later that night an escaped murderer named Nick Grainger (Richard Cramer) stows away on the boat to avoid being caught by the police. The goat they have brought to provide milk chews away at the docking line, and the boat drifts out to sea. The next day Nick confronts Stan and Ollie with a gun (which he affectionately names "Nick Jr."). Taking command over the boat he renames Ollie and Stan "Dizzy and Dopey" and tells them to make him breakfast. They have no food on board, so they decide to prepare Nick a "synthetic" breakfast made up of string, soap and whatever else they can find. Nick spies on them and realizes what they are up to, and forces them to eat the fake food. Upon noticing his trombone which he brought with him, Stan remembers Ollie's violent reaction to horns and starts to play it, resulting in Ollie going into a berserker rage and overcoming the criminal. In fact, two times Stan pauses to catch his breath while the overheating trombone starts to emit smoke, and Ollie has to call to him to keep playing the horn, in order for him to become enraged enough to keep fighting Nick. Eventually Ollie shoves Nick down the companionway amid an avalanche of debris, finally knocking Nick out cold. Stan becomes entangled in the heap and his trombone gets twisted into a large circular shape like a French horn.

When the police arrive in another boat to take Nick into custody, Stan demonstrates to them how he got Hardy powered up --— by playing the mangled trombone. The result: Ollie again flies into a blind horn-induced rage and mindlessly assaults one of the cops, the boys get arrested and are thrown into jail in the same cell that Nick is in. The audience is left to imagine what horrors await the boys when the vengeful Nick regains consciousness, as Ollie irritably says his classic "here's another nice mess... " catchphrase to Stan, who starts to whimper.

Cast

Notes 
 When Laurel and Hardy left the Hal Roach studio after this film, they also left behind Roach stock supporting players Charlie Hall, James Finlayson, and Harry Bernard.
 The film also stars Mary Gordon, who played Mrs. Hudson opposite Basil Rathbone's Sherlock Holmes.
 The film was shown aboard HMS Prince of Wales during the voyage to Newfoundland, where Franklin Delano Roosevelt and Winston Churchill met to establish the Atlantic Charter. It was a favorite film of Churchill, who called it "A gay but inconsequent entertainment".
 The title is an allusion to the 1937 film Souls at Sea, starring Gary Cooper and George Raft.
 This was the last film to feature the once popular silent film comedian Ben Turpin, who has a small cameo as the cross-eyed plumber and died on 1 July 1940, less than two months after the film's release. It was also the last film for Harry Bernard, who died on 4 November 1940.
 "Saps at Sea" is referenced in the Ray Bradbury short story "Night Call, Collect", where a lone Earthman marooned on the abandoned Mars colony is described as watching this Laurel & Hardy film, among various media tapes with which he passes his time.

References

External links 

 
 
 
 
 

1940 films
1940 comedy films
American black-and-white films
1940s English-language films
Films directed by Gordon Douglas
Laurel and Hardy (film series)
Films with screenplays by Charley Rogers
Films with screenplays by Harry Langdon
Films set on boats
1940s American films